Majesty's Loyal Opposition, or simply the Official Opposition, is usually the largest parliamentary opposition party in the House of Commons, either on its own or as part of a governing coalition, although, in certain unusual circumstances, it may be a third or fourth-largest party or even the largest party.

The Official Opposition is viewed as the caucus tasked with keeping the government in check. It is also generally viewed as the alternative government or "government in waiting". The Official Opposition maintains a shadow cabinet, with the leader of the Official Opposition at its head, of members of Parliament (MPs) and senators who often have the same portfolio areas of interest as actual ministers. The spokesperson for each portfolio is known as an opposition critic. In the event the government loses the confidence of the House or the Official Opposition party wins a general election, the party is ready to become the government.

The current Official Opposition is the caucus of the Conservative Party, assuming the role following the 2015 federal election. The Opposition is led by Pierre Poilievre, who became Conservative leader following the 2022 leadership election.

Name
The formal title of "Official Opposition" is used in the Standing Orders of the House of Commons. The Official Opposition is sometimes also referred to as the  Loyal Opposition to express the idea that, although the group may be against the sitting government, it remains loyal to the Crown (the embodiment of the Canadian state) and thus to Canada.

History
After the 1921 election, the Progressive Party, a looseknit largely agrarian "protest" party, won the second largest number of seats to William Lyon Mackenzie King's Liberals, but declined to be the Official Opposition because of their lack of national organization.  The third-place Conservative Party, led by Arthur Meighen, thus became the Official Opposition.

As a result of the 1925 election, the Official Opposition was actually the largest party in the House of Commons, the Conservatives. The Liberals, led by Mackenzie King, were able to form a minority government despite the fact that they had a dozen fewer seats than the Conservatives because King's Liberals were able to win the support of the Progressives to remain in government. Similarly, in Ontario, the Ontario Progressive Conservative Party had the largest caucus but were relegated to official opposition not long after the 1985 election, as their minority government was defeated on a motion of non-confidence. The Ontario Liberal Party, the second largest party, governed from 1985 to 1987 with supply provided by the Ontario New Democratic Party.

In 1993, the Reform Party challenged whether the Quebec sovereigntist Bloc Québécois could hold the position of official opposition.  The Speaker ruled in favour of the Bloc, as they held two more seats than Reform. During the Bloc's time as the official opposition, Quebec issues on national unity dominated Question Period, often to the irritation of the other opposition parties (indeed, Reform was the only other caucus that met official party status, with the NDP and PC parties falling short of that threshold). However, Reform was considered to be main opposition to the Liberals on all other issues that were not specific to Quebec. In 1995, when Bloc leader Lucien Bouchard's position as Opposition Leader granted him a meeting with the visiting American president, Bill Clinton, Reform leader Preston Manning was also given a meeting with Clinton in order to diffuse Bouchard's separatist leverage.

In 1987, the Liberals won every seat in the 51st New Brunswick Legislative Assembly. To ensure the proper functioning of the parliamentary system, Premier Frank McKenna named several members of his own caucus, led by Camille Thériault, to serve as the Official Opposition. The government also allowed the Progressive Conservative Party, which finished second place in the election in the number of votes received, to submit written questions to ministers during Question Period.

Privileges
The Official Opposition party has advantages over other opposition parties in the House. They are assigned to speak first after the government, and receive more time in question period than other opposition parties. It also gets more office space, funding for research, and a larger staff than other parties.

The leader of the Opposition has an official residence in Ottawa known as Stornoway and the salary and similar privileges to those of a cabinet minister. Additionally, the leader and other shadow cabinet members have the privilege of meeting with visiting foreign dignitaries, which is not always granted to members of smaller parties.

Senate
There is also an Official Opposition in the Senate of Canada. This is the largest party in the Senate that is not in government. As the governing party is determined in the House of Commons, the Official Opposition in the Senate may actually be larger than the government party in the Senate. It is customary, however, for the Senate to pass legislation approved in the House of Commons even if the government has a minority in the Senate. Although the Senate nominally has the power to block most legislation (excepting bills which would trigger a non-confidence motion if defeated in the House, such as money bills), this power is rarely exercised in practice.

The party that forms Official Opposition in the Senate is not necessarily the same party as in the House of Commons. From 1993 to 2003, the Official Opposition in the Senate was the Progressive Conservative Party of Canada, even though the Bloc Québécois was the Official Opposition in the House from 1993 to 1997, followed by the Reform Party of Canada, and then the Canadian Alliance from 1997 to 2003. This is because the BQ, and Reform Party had no Senators. However, when Senator Gerry St. Germain crossed the floor from the Progressive Conservatives to the Canadian Alliance in 2000, he argued that he should be recognized as the leader of the Opposition in the Senate as the Canadian Alliance formed the Official Opposition in the House of Commons. The speaker of the Senate of Canada ruled against him, however, as the Progressive Conservatives were the larger opposition party.

Lists of Official Oppositions in the Parliament of Canada

Notes

See also

 Leader of the Official Opposition (Canada)
 List of leaders of the Opposition in the Senate of Canada
 Official Opposition Shadow Cabinet (Canada)

References

External links
The Opposition in the Canadian House of Commons: Role, Structure, and Powers | Mapleleafweb.com

Government of Canada
 
Opposition leaders in Canada